Pampa Grande Airport  is an airport serving the town of Cajabamba, in the Cajamarca Region of Peru.

See also

Transport in Peru
List of airports in Peru

References

External links
OpenStreetMap - Pampa Grande
OurAirports - Cajabamba

Airports in Peru
Buildings and structures in Cajamarca Region